Madonna and Child is a  painting by Giovanni Bellini, now in the Galleria Borghese in Rome. It can be compared with the 1510 Madonna and Child (Brera), the 1505 Madonna del Prato (London) and the 1509 Madonna and Child (Detroit).

References

External links 
Painting at Galleria Borghese

Paintings in the Borghese Collection
Rome
1510 paintings